Aenhenrya is a monotypic genus of terrestrial orchids that spread by means of underground rhizomes. Only one species is known, Aenhenrya rotundifolia, a very rare plant and endemic to southern India (within Kerala and Tamil Nadu).

The genus name of Aenhenrya is in honour of Ambrose Nathaniel Henry (b. 1936), Indian botanist with a focus on the flora of Southern India. The Latin specific epithet of rotundifolia is Latin for round-leaved.
It was first described and published in J. Bombay Nat. Hist. Soc. Vol.90 on page 270 (1993, published in 1994). Then the species was first published in Novon Vol.7 on page 81 in 1997.

The genus is recognized by the United States Department of Agriculture and the Agricultural Research Service, but they do not list any known species.

References

Others sources
 Pridgeon, A. M. et al., eds. 2003. Genera Orchidacearum. 3:66-68. (Oxford University Press)

Monotypic Orchidoideae genera
Goodyerinae
Endemic orchids of India
Flora of Tamil Nadu
Flora of Kerala
Cranichideae genera
Plants described in 1993